Antonio Canales may refer to:

 Antonio Canales Rosillo (1802–1852), Mexican politician, surveyor, and military officer
 Antonio Canales (flamenco) (born 1961), flamenco dancer and choreographer